The National Socialist War Victim's Care (NSKOV) was a social welfare organization for seriously wounded veterans as well as frontline fighters of World War I. The NSKOV was established in 1934 and was affiliated to the Nazi Party.

After Nazi Germany's defeat in World War II, the American military government issued a special law outlawing the Nazi Party and all of its branches. Known as Law number five, this denazification decree disbanded the NSKOV as with all organizations linked to the Nazi Party. The organizations taking care of the welfare for World War I veterans had to be established anew during the postwar reconstruction of both West and East Germany.

History 
The headquarters of the organization was in Kreuzberg, Berlin (at the time called the SW 68 district) and employed the architect Willy Muehlau to design cheap residential complexes for Nazi war veterans. These complexes emerged some time between the late 1920s and early 1930s and are protected according to the City of Berlin's Denkmalliste (monument list).

Notes and references

See also 
 Deutscher Kriegerbund

External links 

 NSKOV ceremony
 History: Property control in the U.S.-occupied area of Germany

German veterans' organisations
Aftermath of World War I in Germany
Social welfare charities
1934 establishments in Germany
1945 disestablishments in Germany
Nazi Party organizations
Organizations established in 1934
Organizations disestablished in 1945
Non-profit organisations based in Berlin